Gustav Edgar Törner Åhsman (30 July 1931 – 30 October 2016) was a Swedish heavyweight boxer. He competed at the 1956 Summer Olympics, but was eliminated in the second round by Lev Mukhin. After the Olympics he turned professional and had a record of 11 wins, 3 losses and 2 draws before retiring in 1962.

1956 Olympic results
Below is the record of Törner Åhsman, a Swedish heavyweight boxer who competed at the 1956 Melbourne Olympics:

 Round of 16: defeated Patrick Sharkey (Ireland) by third-round knockout
 Quarterfinal: lost to Lev Mukhin (Soviet Union) by first-round knockout

References

1931 births
2016 deaths
Boxers at the 1956 Summer Olympics
Olympic boxers of Sweden
Swedish male boxers
Heavyweight boxers
20th-century Swedish people